Guyanancistrus megastictus is a species of catfish in the family Loricariidae. It is native to South America, where it occurs in a forested tributary of the upper Maroni basin in French Guiana, near the Mitaraka Massif, which is a prominent massif in the area. The species reaches 6.3 cm (2.5 inches) in standard length. Its specific epithet, megastictus, is derived from Ancient Greek and refers to its large spots.

References 

Fish described in 2018
Freshwater fish of South America
Hypostominae